Mücver is a Turkish fritter or pancake, made from grated zucchini. They are typically pan-fried in oil and their batter often includes a mixture of eggs, onion, dill, parsley, flour, and sometimes potatoes and cheese (beyaz peynir or kaşar). They are similar to Jewish latkes and potato pancakes from various cultures.

History 
Though mücver is currently known as a vegetable patty made with zucchini, in the Ottoman cuisine, it used to be known as a cooking technique. Written as mücmer in Ottoman records, it transformed into mücver in modern Turkish.

See also
 List of fried dough foods

References

External links

Turkish vegetarian cuisine
Squash and pumpkin dishes
Ottoman cuisine
Fritters